"Ether" is a diss song by American rapper Nas, from his 2001 album Stillmatic. The song was a response to Jay-Z's "Takeover", a diss track directed towards Nas and Prodigy.

Nas named the song "Ether" stating,  "Ether" has been called a "classic" diss track and the "wildest" in hip hop history by music publications.

Song
Jay-Z dismissed Nas as a has-been on the diss track "Takeover". Nas responds to Jay's claims by rapping, "I got this, locked since Nine-One (1991), I am the truest/ Name a rapper that I ain't influenced." The song contains numerous slurs, many of the homophobic, directed at Jay-Z: 
 "When these streets keep calling, heard it when I was asleep/ That this Gay-Z and Cock-A-Fella Records wanted beef"
 "Then you got the nerve to say that you're better than Big/ Dick-suckin' lips, why don't you let the late great veteran live"
 "You a dick-ridin' faggot, you love the attention/ Queens niggas run you niggas, ask Russell Simmons"
 "Put it together/ I rock hos; y'all rock fellas."

Nas also attacks Jay-Z's street cred, claiming, "In '88, you was gettin' chased to your buildin'/ Callin' my crib, and I ain't even give you my numbers/ All I did was give you a style for you to run with." He also accuses Jay of selling out, "Y'all niggas deal with emotions like bitches/ What's sad is I love you cause you're my brother, you traded your soul for riches." Nas also criticized him for copying KRS-One ideas on the name of Jay-Z's current album at the time, The Blueprint, which was quite similar to the Boogie-Down Production's album, Ghetto Music: The Blueprint of Hip Hop, with the line "KRS already made an album called Blueprint." He had lines calling Jay unattractive and accusing him of misogyny, as well as having an affair with Foxy Brown in the late 1990s (which she would confirm years later in her track "Let em Know") rapping, "You seem to be only concerned with dissin' women/ Were you abused as a child, scared to smile, they called you ugly?" and "Foxy kept you hot, kept your face in her puss/ What you think you gettin' girls now because of your looks?", "started cocking up my weapon slowly loading up this ammo to explode it on a Camel and his soldiers I can handle ". He also accuses Jay of brown nosing other rappers for fame: "Your ass went from Jaz to hangin' with Kane, to Irv to Big/ And, Eminem murdered you on your own shit." Not only does he criticize the usage of other rappers' influence for increased fame, he mentions that Eminem outshined him on his song, "Renegade". Finally, Nas insults Jay-Z's biting of Big's lyrics claiming that Jay-Z stole his rhyming skills off Biggie, "How much of Biggie's rhymes gonna come out your fat lips?". The intro of Ether starts with gunshots from Notorious B.I.G.'s "Who Shot Ya?", immediately followed by a screwed voice of 2Pac saying "Fuck Jay-Z", originally taken from the song "Fuck Friendz". In the outro of "Ether", Nas mocks the chorus of "Takeover", which Jay-Z raps "R-O-C, we runnin' this rap shit", Nas changes it to "R-O-C, get gunned up and clapped quick" and so on.

The backing track of "Ether", produced by a then relatively unknown Ron Browz, found its way to Nas after Browz's manager, who worked at the Def Jam Recordings offices, bumped into Nas' travel agent and pleaded with her to give the production to Nas. Browz was unaware of how his production would be used until Nas invited him to the studio to play him the completed song for the first time. Browz had previously offered the production to Kyambo "Hip-Hop" Joshua, Jay-Z's A&R manager at the time, who turned it down.

In an 2012 interview with hip-hop website ThisIs50, fellow rapper Large Professor claimed that an earlier version of "Ether" was produced by Swizz Beatz and featured even more offensive lyrics, including a line where Nas allegedly raps "It should've been you in that plane crash", a reference to the 2001 plane crash that caused the death of American singer Aaliyah, which occurred during the early stages of the Jay-Z–Nas feud. Large Professor expanded on this in a further interview with DJ Vlad in 2019, stating that the full lyric reads "Sorry Aaliyah / I’m sorry it was you in the plane crash / It should’ve been Jay... Dame Dash [Jay-Z's fellow Roc-A-Fella Records co-founder]."

Release and aftermath
On the day "Ether" was released, Jay-Z and Dame Dash visited a New York City club where the DJ started to play the song. Both men told the DJ not to do so, but he refused the request and played it anyway. Fellow rapper Ras Kass, also present in the club that night, cited this – along with the rapturous response of the club attendees once the song was eventually played – as a major turning point in the feud and a sign that Nas would emerge victorious: "...the club was going up, and that’s when I knew it was over. The DJ was like, 'Fuck that,' and played that shit. And the club went up. That’s when I knew Nas won. The streets had spoken. The DJ played it and Jay was in the building […] Nas beat Jay."

Jay-Z responded to "Ether" with two tracks; in the first "People Talkin'", he mocks Nas's lyrical ability and height, among others. Nas responded by saying, "[Jay-Z] was saying my rhymes like 'judas' and 'you're arms too short to box' then he wants to drop [MTV Unplugged] the same day as me". In the second, "Supa Ugly", Jay-Z states that he slept with the mother of Nas's child. After a phone call from his mother, Jay-Z admitted that he went too far with this insult and apologized. "Supa Ugly" marked the "official" end of the battle, although references to the beef can be found on Nas' "Last Real Nigga Alive" from God's Son, "U Wanna Be Me" from 8 Mile and "Everybody's Crazy" from The Lost Tapes, and Jay-Z's "Blueprint 2" from The Blueprint 2: The Gift and the Curse album. The last subliminal shots thrown at each other was on the Bravehearts' single "Quick To Back Down" featuring Nas & Lil Jon, in which Nas claims that he's better than Jay-Z. In response to this, Jay-Z released the "Public Service Announcement 2" in which he takes shots at Nas.

The Jay-Z vs. Nas feud was beneficial to both men's careers. Stillmatic and "Ether" had marked the reemergence of Nas to the hip hop scene two years after having released Nastradamus, considered by many fans and critics to have been the weakest album in his discography.  Many fans still credit the feud with resurrecting Nas' career; while he has not matched the commercial success of It Was Written or I Am..., his work since Stillmatic has been better received critically. The battle also boosted Jay-Z's career, giving him much notoriety for having the bravado to attack a respected rapper such as Nas. The feud (or "beef") between the two rappers has since been reconciled, and they have gone on to collaborate on the song "Black Republican", from Nas's 2006 album Hip Hop Is Dead, "Success", from Jay-Z's 2007 album American Gangster, "I Do It For Hip Hop" from Ludacris' 2008 album Theater of the Mind, "BBC" from Jay-Z's 2013 album Magna Carta Holy Grail as well as the unreleased song "The Scientist" produced by Just Blaze and this song was rumored to be a song that did not make Nas' Untitled album.

Legacy

"Ether" has been cited as a "classic" diss track and the "wildest" in hip hop history by music publications. When asked to name his favorite rap battle, Papoose pointed to the feud between Jay-Z and Nas, citing the release Ether as one of the decisive moments of the affair: "That's one of the great battles, there's other ones too though, in hip-hop history. I can go on and on, but that's one that stands out...It wasn't an age thing but a lot of people were sleeping. Like, 'It's over! Jay-Z killed him!' I was like, 'Aight, watch.' I knew it was coming, man." (Hot 93.7) Similarly, Jadakiss claims that "...'Ether' sits on the mantle when it comes to battle songs. From the production, to the way he formatted it, to what he was saying – he touched everything. It was an A-Plus grade." In contrast, Kendrick Lamar considers "Takeover" to be the superior diss song of the two, arguing that whilst "Ether" was "powerful", he preferred "Takeover" because "...[Jay-Z] was saying more facts" and suggests that many only supported Nas as the perceived underdog of the feud at the time.

Due to the popularity of "Ether", Ron Browz went on to nickname himself Etherboy.

Shortly after Nas released the song, the word "ether" entered the hip hop lexicon as a slang expression synonymous with ruthlessness – meaning to harshly humiliate an opponent. “To 'ether' someone," writes Son Raw, "means to completely dismantle them in a rap battle with no regard for petty concerns such as 'logic' or 'cleverness' – it’s a giant shock-n-awe display of machismo meant to scar the victim for life and leave an unmistakable blemish on his career." In addition, the song itself helped to popularize the term "stan" as a pejorative term (which originally referenced Eminem's 2000 hit single, denoting an obsessive fan.)

Ether has also been referenced and sampled by rappers who have sought to stylize their own diss recordings along similar lines of severity, including Game, Joe Budden, Saigon, Shyne, and Joey Bada$$ among others. Eminem took the sample of "Ether" and used it in Xzibit's song "My Name", featuring Nate Dogg, which was a diss song to Jermaine Dupri. Jin used the instrumental of the song to diss Rosie O'Donnell. In 2012, Cassidy, alluded to the song in his threat against Meek Mill, "If I do a diss record, it's going to be on the 'Ether' level if not worse." Cassidy went on to record a song against Mill titled R.A.I.D. which samples and quotes segments of Ether.

Remy Ma also used the instrumentals for her own diss track titled "Shether" aimed at Nicki Minaj which was released on February 25, 2017.

Charts

See also
List of notable diss tracks

References

2001 songs
Nas songs
Song recordings produced by Ron Browz
Songs written by Nas
Diss tracks
Songs written by Ron Browz